Chala (Cala) is a Gur language of Ghana.

References

Languages of Ghana
Gurunsi languages